Grower may refer to:

 Farmer
 Sharecropper
 Stockgrower (disambiguation)

See also
 
 
 Grow (disambiguation)